Luca Brasi is a fictional character in Mario Puzo's 1969 novel The Godfather, as well as its 1972 film adaptation. In the film, he was portrayed by Lenny Montana, an ex-wrestler and former bodyguard and enforcer for the Colombo crime family.

Fictional character biography
Luca Brasi is Don Vito Corleone's personal enforcer, and the only man Vito himself fears. Brasi is fiercely loyal and has a reputation as a savage and remorseless killer. He once murdered six men single-handedly to protect Don Corleone; only when Vito himself ordered him to stop did Brasi end his rampage, which contributed significantly to ending the "Olive Oil War." Brasi's loyalty to Don Corleone and the Corleone family is unquestioned; he is said to have killed a Corleone soldier just for making the family look bad. Brasi reportedly said he would sooner kill himself than betray the Godfather.

In a notable incident, Brasi intercepted two hitmen sent by Al Capone to assassinate Don Corleone as a favor for one of Corleone's rivals. Brasi subdued both men with his bare hands before binding and gagging them with towels. Watching as Brasi brutally dismembered and butchered his partner with an axe, the other man became terrified and choked to death on the towel.

An old Sicilian woman who had once worked as the neighborhood midwife once told Vito's youngest son Michael that, years earlier, she attended a young Irish girl as she gave birth to Brasi's child. Brasi forced the midwife to throw the crying infant into a burning furnace, saying he wanted none of "that race" to live (she does not know whether he referred to his own blood or the woman's) and a few days later murdered the girl. The distraught midwife, fearing she would be next, sought Vito Corleone's help. Don Corleone intervened, protecting the woman while covering up Brasi's crime and bringing him into his family, thus gaining his undying service and loyalty.

Brasi was surprised to be invited to Connie Corleone's wedding. To show his respect and gratitude, he personally presented the Don with a large cash gift for his daughter's bridal purse, which Brasi intended to be the largest sum given, in addition to a pledge of loyalty to the daughter and future grandchildren. This scene also exposes another aspect of Luca: while ruthless and loyal, he is not particularly intelligent or articulate, and he struggles to deliver the speech accompanying the gift.  During the reception, Michael's girlfriend Kay Adams asked him about Brasi. Michael relates the story of how his father once helped his godson, Johnny Fontane, back when Fontane's career was just starting to take off. Don Corleone had offered bandleader Les Halley $10,000 to release Fontane from his contract when he learned that Halley was unfairly exploiting his godson's fame. His offer refused, Vito returned the next day accompanied by Brasi and his then-consigliere Genco Abbandando. He then repeated his offer to Halley at gunpoint, this time telling him that either his signature or his brains would wind up on the contract. Halley agreed, accepting Corleone's payment of $10,000 (in the movie, only $1,000). 

Suspicious of drug baron Virgil "The Turk" Sollozzo and his dealings with the Tattaglia family, Don Corleone orders Brasi to feign dissatisfaction working for the Corleones and convince Sollozzo that he is willing to work for him as a means of gathering information. Don Philip Tattaglia then arranges a meeting between Brasi and Sollozzo. Sollozzo, not fooled by the ruse, has Brasi strangled to death with piano wire. Sometime later, the Corleone family receives a package containing Brasi's custom-made bulletproof vest wrapped around a dead fish, an old Sicilian message that indicates Brasi "sleeps with the fishes".

When Michael succeeds his father as Don of the Corleone family, Brasi's role as personal enforcer/bodyguard is filled by Al Neri, whom Michael "has ma[d]e...his Luca Brasi".

In other media 
Luca Brasi plays a major role in the prequel novel The Family Corleone by Ed Falco. During the Great Depression, Luca Brasi is the leader of a small but feared street gang with ties to Sonny Corleone, who uses them as muscle to aid his family. The younger Brasi is described as a psychopath who has his own newborn child murdered by forcing an old woman to throw it alive into a burning furnace, lets its mother, Irish-American prostitute Kelly O'Rourke, die a savage death at his hands, and regularly abuses drugs. He also plans to kill Corleone associate Tom Hagen for having a one-night stand with Kelly, a feud that Vito settles by paying Brasi off. Brasi spends the money on more drugs; the resulting overdose causes him to suffer a complete mental breakdown that makes him even more unstable and dangerous. Although Vito dislikes and fears Brasi, he eventually recruits the brutal thug into his crime family, knowing that Brasi's formidable reputation would intimidate the Corleone family's enemies. 

Brasi has a larger role in The Godfather: The Game. At his daughter's wedding, Vito accepts Brasi's gift and instructs him to track down the protagonist, Aldo Trapani, who has fallen in with a local gang. Brasi finds Aldo getting beaten up and intervenes, acting as a "trainer" for players by teaching them how to fight and defend themselves. He also trains players in the use of firearms and weapons, and explains how to manage rackets, use safehouses, and deal with the other Mafia families. Later in the game, the player is sent to accompany Brasi to his fateful meeting with Virgil Sollozzo on Tattaglia family turf; after witnessing Brasi's murder, the player has to escape and inform the family of his death.

Brasi inspired Baton Rouge rapper Kevin Gates to create his 2013 mixtape, The Luca Brasi Story, and its sequel, Luca Brasi 2, hosted by DJ Drama and released on December 15, 2014.

According to film historian Laurent Bouzereau, the strangling death at the hands of Leia Organa of crime boss Jabba the Hutt's in Return of the Jedi was suggested by script writer Lawrence Kasdan. George Lucas approved the idea, which was said to be inspired by Brasi's death scene from The Godfather.

Luca Brasi is mentioned in the chorus of I Am The Mob by Catatonia and in Click...off...gone by Sleeper.

References 

Characters in American novels of the 20th century
Fictional assassins
Fictional characters from New York City
Literary characters introduced in 1969
Fictional filicides
Fictional henchmen
Fictional gangsters
Fictional Italian American people
The Godfather characters
Cultural depictions of the Mafia
Fictional murdered people
Film characters introduced in 1972